Ryan Karim Buchanan is an American lawyer who has served as the United States attorney for the Northern District of Georgia since 2022.

Education 

Buchanan earned a Bachelor of Science from Samford University in 2001 and a Juris Doctor the Vanderbilt University Law School in 2005.

Career 

In 2005 and 2006, Buchanan served as a law clerk for Judge Inge Prytz Johnson of the United States District Court for the Northern District of Alabama. From 2006 to 2010, he was an associate at McGuireWoods. He joined the United States Attorney's Office for the Northern District of Georgia in 2010.

U.S. attorney for the Northern District of Georgia 
On November 12, 2021, President Joe Biden announced his intent to nominate Buchanan to serve as the United States attorney for the Northern District of Georgia. On November 15, 2021, his nomination was sent to the United States Senate. On January 13, 2022, his nomination was reported out of the Senate Judiciary Committee. On April 27, 2022, his nomination was confirmed in the Senate by voice vote. He was sworn into office on May 2, 2022.

References

External links 

Living people
21st-century American lawyers
African-American lawyers
Georgia (U.S. state) lawyers
Samford University alumni
United States Attorneys for the Northern District of Georgia
Vanderbilt University Law School alumni
Year of birth missing (living people)